The Astonishing Hypothesis is a 1994 book by scientist Francis Crick about consciousness. Crick, one of the co-discoverers of the molecular structure of DNA, later became a theorist for neurobiology and the study of the brain. The Astonishing Hypothesis is mostly concerned with establishing a basis for scientific study of consciousness; however, Crick places the study of consciousness within a larger social context. Human consciousness according to Crick is central to human existence and so scientists find themselves approaching topics traditionally left to philosophy and religion.

Synopsis
The Astonishing Hypothesis posits that "a person's mental activities are entirely due to the behavior of nerve cells, glial cells, and the atoms, ions, and molecules that make them up and influence them." Crick claims that scientific study of the brain during the 20th century led to acceptance of consciousness, free will, and the human soul as subjects for scientific investigation.

Rather than attempting to cover all the aspects of consciousness (self-awareness, thought, imagination, perception, etc.), Crick focuses on the primate visual system and breaks down the prerequisites for conscious experience into several broad subconditions, including some sort of short-term memory and attention mechanism. The book then delves into a brief overview of many neuroscientific topics, ranging from a survey of how neurons function to a description of basic neural circuits and their artificial equivalents. Throughout, Crick cites various experiments which illustrate the narrow points he is making about visual awareness, such as studies investigating the phenomenon of blindsight in macaques.

The later chapters of the book try to synthesize many of the points made earlier about the visual system into a unified framework, although Crick frequently notes the many exceptions to his assumptions and the clumsiness of many of his attempts at synthesis. Also, here he takes the opportunity to make suggestions for further experiments that could provide empirical basis for further understanding about human consciousness and includes a brief addendum on several topics he purposefully glossed over, like free will. Overall, the message Crick repeats as the main purpose of writing the Astonishing Hypothesis is to break the scientific community's reluctance to give consciousness a thorough and scientifically-grounded investigation, and to encourage others such as philosophers to address the issues of consciousness in a way that takes account of neuroscientific discoveries.

Background and response
Crick had discussed the relationship between science and religion in his earlier book What Mad Pursuit. Crick's view of this relationship was that religions can be wrong about scientific matters and that part of what science does is to confront the errors that exist within religious traditions. For example, the idea of a mechanism for the evolution of life by natural selection conflicts with some views on creation of life by divine intervention. Crick's subtitle for The Astonishing Hypothesis is The Scientific Search for the Soul.

Criticism
Crick's decidedly materialistic approach to explaining consciousness has many detractors both in the neuroscientific and philosophical communities. Some, such as neurologist and Nobel Laureate Gerald Edelman believe that neural Darwinism is a more satisfactory explanation for the emergence of complex intelligence in humans. Another school of thought, this one largely made up of those outside of scientific disciplines, consider consciousness to either be simply beyond the possibility of explanation or at least dependent on some qualities that are not simply physical (i.e. molecules, etc.). Lastly, those who support quantum theory of mind also disagree with how Crick simplifies the workings of the brain to only classical physics.

See also
 Consciousness–matter dualism
 China Brain
 Epiphenomenalism
 Physicalism

References

External links 

 "Review of The Astonishing Hypothesis" @Association for the Scientific Study of Consciousness (theASSC.org)

 

Consciousness studies
Cognitive science literature
1994 non-fiction books